Rubinius was an alternative Ruby implementation created by Evan Phoenix. Based loosely on the Smalltalk-80 Blue Book design, Rubinius sought to
"provide a rich, high-performance environment for running Ruby code."

Goals
Rubinius follows in the Lisp and Smalltalk traditions, by natively implementing as much of Ruby as possible in Ruby code.

It also has a goal of being thread-safe in order to be able to embed more than one interpreter in a single application.

Sponsorship 
From 2007 to 2013, Engine Yard funded one full-time engineer to work exclusively on Rubinius. Evan Phoenix now works at HashiCorp.

PowerPC64 support 
Since version 2.4.0, support on PowerPC64 is enabled.

See also

 Jikes RVM
 JRuby
 MacRuby
MagLev
 Parrot virtual machine
 PyPy
 Squawk
 Squeak
 YARV

References

External links
 
 Evan Phoenix's Blog
 Evan Phoenix's video at RubyConf 2007
 Evan Phoenix's video at MountainWest RubyConf 2008
 Evan Phoenix's presentation at RubyConf 2008
 
 The Great Ruby Shootout (December 2008): Rubinius compared to other common Ruby VMs
 
 Is It Rubinius?- Community-powered gem compatibility for Rubinius

Beta software
Free compilers and interpreters
Free software programmed in C++
Free software programmed in Ruby
Ruby (programming language)